Adrian Owen Charles  (31 July 1926 – 10 April 2013) was an Australian Anglican bishop, who served as Assistant bishop for the Western Region in the Anglican Diocese of Brisbane from 1983 to 1992, and as Bishop to the Australian Defence Force from 1989 to 1994.

Charles was born in Warwick, Queensland on 31 July 1926. He attended St Catherine's School and Slade School in Warwick, and later studied at St Francis' Theological College and the University of Queensland. He was ordained deacon in 1950 and priest in 1952.

In his parish ministry, Charles served in a variety of roles, including as chaplain to the Southport School, as Vicar at Wondai and St Lucia and Ipswich, and as Senior Anglican Chaplain to the Northern Command from 1963 to 1966. Charles was appointed Archdeacon of Moreton from 1968 to 1970, became Dean of St James' Cathedral, Townsville in the Diocese of North Queensland from 1972 to 1977, and returned to a military role from 1978 to 1983 as Senior Anglican Chaplain to the 1st Military District.

Charles was consecrated as bishop, and appointed Assistant Bishop for the Western Region, on 1 March 1983 by Archbishop of Brisbane Sir John Grindrod. He later served as the third Anglican Bishop to the Australian Defence Force, replacing Ken Short, from 1989 to 1994.

Charles was appointed as a Member of the Order of Australia in the 1994 Queen's Birthday Honours for "service to the community through the Anglican Church of Australia". 

Charles was married to Leonie and was survived by children and grandchildren.

Charles died on 10 April 2013 in Sinnamon Park, Queensland.

References

1926 births
2013 deaths
20th-century Anglican bishops in Australia
Anglican bishops to the Australian Defence Force
Anglican Church of Australia deans
Assistant bishops in the Anglican Diocese of Brisbane
Australian Army officers
Members of the Order of Australia
People from Warwick, Queensland